The  is a pole weapon that was used by the samurai class and their retainers in feudal Japan.

History and description
The sodegarami is a type of man catcher. The pole is sturdy hardwood with sharp metal barbs or spines attached to metal strips on one end to keep the person being captured from grabbing the pole. The opposite end of the pole has a metal cap or ishizuki, like those found on naginata and other pole weapons. The sodegarami,  tsukubō (push pole), and sasumata (spear fork) comprise the torimono sandōgu (three implements of arresting) used by samurai police to capture suspected criminals uninjured. The sodegarami was used to entangle the sleeves and clothing of an individual who could then be more easily disarmed or dealt with.

The sodegarami evolved from the yagaramogara, which was a long pole implement employed by naval forces. That instrument in turn was derived from the Chinese langxian, which was used to defend against Japanese pirates during the Ming dynasty (1368-1644). Alternative names for the sodegarami include roga-bō, shishigashira, neji, and tōrigarami.

Gallery

References

Sources 
 Cunningham, Don. Taiho-jutsu:Law and Order in the Age of the Samurai. Boston; Rutland, Vermont; Tokyo: Tuttle Publishing, 2004.
 神之田常盛. 剣術神道霞流. 萩原印刷株式会社, 2003.
 Mol, Serge. Classic Weaponry of Japan: Special Weapons and Tactics of the Martial Arts. Tokyo; New York; London: Kodansha International, 2003.

External links

Samurai police weapons
Polearms of Japan
Samurai polearms